Frank Fisher Bennett (September 15, 1890 – April 29, 1957) was an American film actor active during the silent era. He played the role of Charles IX in D. W. Griffith's 1916 epic Intolerance.

Born in New York, Bennett worked for Vitagraph in New York before he moved to Hollywood with D. W. Griffith.

During World War I, Bennett joined the Army and worked in Washington in the Ordnance Department. 

He was married to actress Billie West. After they stopped working in films, they settled in Warren Township, New Jersey, in a home adjacent to his parents' home.

Filmography

References

External links 

Male actors from California
American male film actors
People from Bakersfield, California
1890 births
1957 deaths